Djurmo is a locality situated in Gagnef Municipality, Dalarna County, Sweden. It had 711 inhabitants in 2010.

References 

Populated places in Dalarna County
Populated places in Gagnef Municipality